Alexandre Ferdinand Parseval-Deschenes (27 November 1790 – 10 June 1860) was a French admiral and senator.

Life 
Born in Paris to an aristocratic family, Alexandre was the nephew of the mathematician Marc-Antoine Parseval and the Académicien François-Auguste Parseval-Grandmaison. He volunteered for the Navy in 1804 and participated in the recapture of Fort Le Diamant on Martinique, then fought at Trafalgar as an aspirant on board Bucentaure, the admiral's flagship. As an enseigne de vaisseau, Parseval-Deschenes participated in the 1815 hydrographic investigations of Brittany. In 1817 he took part in the expedition that retook Guyana for France, ending its occupation by Portugal, and then commanded the French naval station in that colony for two years.

In 1822, as lieutenant de vaisseau, Alexandre was awarded the Légion d'honneur for successfully rescuing the crew of the frigate Africaine, shipwrecked on the Newfoundland coast. He then commanded the frigate Iphigénie in the Mexico expedition participating in the blockade of Veracruz and bombardment of San Juan de Ulúa in 1838, then the occupation of Argentine island of Martin-Garcia in 1839.

Promoted to contre-amiral on 30 April 1840, Alexandre then served as major-general of the navy at Toulon, then Maritime Prefect at Cherbourg-en-Cotentin, before commanding the training squadron in the Mediterranean. He then rose to vice admiral on 15 July 1846, he next served as Maritime Prefect at Toulon then once again commander of the Mediterranean training squadron. He entered the Conseil de l'amirauté in 1851 and presided over the Board of Construction. He was made a senator by Napoleon III on 26 November 1852. He then commanded France's Baltic fleet during the Crimean War, with which he bombarded the Russian fortress of Bomarsund and received its surrender on 16 August - as a reward he was promoted to admiral on the following 2 December. Admiral Parseval-Deschenes is buried at the Cimetière du Père-Lachaise and a late 19th-century aviso in the French Navy (launched in 1879 and decommissioned in 1898) was named after him.

Decorations 
 Grand Cross of the Légion d'honneur  - 30 August 1854.
 Médaille Militaire - 1854.

See also
Politics of France
Military history of France

References

External links 
 Illustrated biography of Parseval-Deschênes.

1790 births
1860 deaths
French Navy admirals
French life senators
French military personnel of the Crimean War
Burials at Père Lachaise Cemetery
Politicians from Paris
French military personnel of the Napoleonic Wars
Grand Croix of the Légion d'honneur